The Seamaster 2017 ITTF-Asian Championships were held in Wuxi, China, from 9 to 16 April 2017.

Schedule
Five individual and two team events were contested.

Medal summary

Medal table

Events

See also
2017 Asian Cup Table Tennis Tournament

References

Asian Table Tennis Championships
Asian Table Tennis Championships
Table Tennis Championships
Table tennis competitions in China
Asian Table Tennis Championships
Asian Table Tennis Championships